The Queen is a 1968 American documentary film directed by Frank Simon and narrated by Flawless Sabrina. It depicts the experiences of the drag queens organizing and participating in the 1967 Miss All-America Camp Beauty Contest held at New York City's Town Hall. The film was screened at the International Critics' Week section of the 1968 Cannes Film Festival; however, the festival was ultimately curtailed and ended due to ongoing civil unrest in France before any awards could be given out.

First released in the United States in June 1968 to generally positive reviews, it was subsequently screened in France (November 1968), Netherlands (1969), Denmark (1969), and Finland (1969). The film was revived in January 2013 at New York Film Forum, followed by a 4K restoration screened during the 2019 Melbourne International Film Festival.

In 2020, Kino Lorber released a Blu-ray of the restored version of The Queen, with bonus additional footage, an interview with Flawless Sabrina, and Queens at Heart as additional features.

Synopsis 
Jack, a 24-year-old gay man living in New York and working as a drag queen named Flawless Sabrina, is the mistress of ceremonies for the 1967 Miss All-America Camp Beauty Contest. The competition operates on a points system: a maximum of five points each for walk, talk, bathing suit, gown, make-up and hair-do; and ten points for beauty.

In between rehearsing and performing, the contestants discuss topics such as draft boards, sexual identity, sex reassignment surgery, transgender identities, and being a drag queen. One contestant, Pepper Labeija recounts receiving a draft notice and being turned away because of his feminine appearance, despite requesting to serve and protect his country.

Jack's protégé, Richard, performs under the name Rachel Harlow and enters the contest. Also competing is Crystal LaBeija (who would later become the founder of the House of LaBeija). Rachel and Crystal both make it into the top five, with each finalist completing a final runway walk into the audience, which includes Andy Warhol, George Plimpton and Terry Southern. Crystal places fourth, to her displeasure, and storms off the stage. Rachel is ultimately crowned as the winner.

Some contestants are shown protesting Rachel's win; Crystal states that the contest was fixed and that she may sue Sabrina. As they leave the building, Crystal runs into Rachel and Sabrina on the stairs where Sabrina denies the allegations. The film closes on Rachel out of drag, walking through the Port Authority Bus Terminal and twirling her crown on one hand.

Reception

Critical response 
The documentary originally opened to generally positive reviews in June 1968, when first released in the United States, with subsequent releases across Europe in 1968 and 1969.

In January 2013, The Queen was revived at the Film Forum in New York, then restored in 2019 by Kino Lorber for screenings at the IFC Center and Melbourne International Film Festival.

In a 1968 The New York Times review, Renata Adler called the film an "extraordinary documentary" that "shows us another America." Andrew Sarris from Village Voice stated "The drag queen contestants are eminently likable in curiously peripheral ways."

In a retrospective piece written after the film's restoration, Jerry Portwood of Rolling Stone  described the film as "extraordinary because it captures so much, doubling as a time capsule of a generation's innocence and fashion-forward sophistication. You can tell why it functioned as a template for many future gender-nonconforming people looking for some sort of pre-internet guide through the confusing maze of sexuality and gender."

Influence on popular culture 
The film's concluding scene featuring Crystal LaBeija has led to The Queen become a "cult favourite"; Crystal's speech was sampled in the track "Ambience 001" in Frank Ocean's album Endless, and drag queen Aja (who would later join the House of LaBeija) impersonated LaBeija in season three of RuPaul's Drag Race: All Stars.

The Queen has often been compared to Paris Is Burning, a documentary focusing on the New York City drag ball scene of the 1980s, which includes in its cast members of the House of LaBeija.

References

Further reading

External links

1968 films
1968 documentary films
Documentary films about LGBT topics
American documentary films
Historiography of LGBT in New York City
Drag (clothing)-related films
1968 LGBT-related films
1960s English-language films
Films directed by Frank Simon
1960s American films